The Atlantic 21 is part of the B class of lifeboats that served the shores of the United Kingdom and Ireland as part of the Royal National Lifeboat Institution (RNLI) inshore fleet. The Atlantic 21 was the first generation rigid inflatable boat (RIB), originated at and by Atlantic College in South Wales, the birth place of the RIB after which the craft is so named.  The school was also one of nine locations where the RNLI first established lifeboat stations using smaller inshore watercraft. Atlantic College Lifeboat Station was commissioned by the RNLI in 1963 and decommissioned in 2013.

Nearly all of the Atlantic 21s have been retired from service by 2006, one of the notable exceptions to this being the boat allocated to Walmer in Kent. RNLB James Burgess (B-589) was retired to the relief fleet in December 2006. It was replaced by an Atlantic 85.

Description
The Atlantic 21 can be launched from a davit, trolley or floating boathouse depending on the location of the station and the available facilities.

The boat carries a variety of equipment which includes two VHF radios, first aid kit and oxygen, GPS navigation system, night vision equipment, self-righting system, anchor and various warps, toolkit, towing system, illuminating and distress pyrotechnics, spotlight, torches.

The rollbar assembly installed above the engines contains a self-righting bag which is operated by a member of the crew activating a gas bottle.

Fleet

External links 

 RNLI FLeet
 Lifeboatsonline.com (Atlantic 21)
 Atlantic College Lifeboat Station
 RIB History (2017 video) at UWC Atlantic College